Two highways in the U.S. state of California have been signed as Route 10 :
 Interstate 10 in California, part of the Interstate Highway System
 California State Route 10 (1934-1960s), later Route 42